Malé  or  Sori Malé  or Mal is a town and commune in the Brakna Region of southern Mauritania on the border with Senegal.

In 2000 it had a population of 20,488.

References

Communes of Brakna Region
Mauritania–Senegal border crossings